National Horticulture Mission (NHM) is an Indian horticulture Scheme promoted by Government of India. It was launched under the 10th five-year plan in the year 2005-06. While Government of India contributes 85%, 15% share is contributed by State Governments.

Objectives
The NHM's key objective is to develop horticulture to the maximum potential available in the state and to augment production of all horticultural products (fruits, vegetables, flowers, coco, cashew nut, plantation crops, spices, medicinal aromatic plants) in the state. Other objectives include:

To provide holistic growth of the horticulture sector through an area based regionally differentiated strategies 
To enhance horticulture production, improve nutritional security and income support to farm households
To establish convergence and synergy among multiple ongoing and planned programmes for horticulture development
To promote, develop and disseminate technologies, through a seamless blend of traditional wisdom and modern scientific knowledge
To create opportunities for employment generation for skilled and unskilled persons, especially unemployed youth

Different Missions 

 Kerala State Horticulture Mission

References

External links
 Official website
 India Development Gateway - National Horticulture Mission
 National Horticulture Board

Agricultural organisations based in India
Horticultural organisations based in India
Government schemes in India
Indian missions